Frank 'Bucket' H. Young (c. 1885 – 1941) was a Welsh rugby union, and professional rugby league footballer who played in the 1900s and 1910s.

Background
Young was born in Cardiff, Wales.

Playing career

Rugby union
Young was a promising player for Cardiff, playing in the reserves before being promoted to the senior team. Young only played one senior season, and may have achieved more but was kept out of the squad by Bert Winfield, one of the greatest Welsh kickers of all time. Young played several games for London Welsh and Bristol before switching to rugby league. He was described by ex-Wales union captain, Arthur Harding, as 'He has a lovely kick, of the Jackett type, and a useful tackler.' Frank Young represented Glamorgan.

International honours
Frank Young won caps for Wales (RL) while at Leeds including in 1909 against England, and won a cap for Great Britain (RL) while at Leeds in 1909 against Australia.

Challenge Cup Final appearances
Frank Young played , and scored 2-goals in Leeds' 7-7 draw with Hull F.C. in the 1909–10 Challenge Cup Final during the 1909–10 season at Fartown Ground, Huddersfield on Saturday 16 April 1910, in front of a crowd of 19,413, and played , and scored 7-goals in the 26-12 victory over Hull F.C. in the 1909–10 Challenge Cup Final replay during the 1909–10 season at Fartown Ground, Huddersfield, on Monday 18 April 1910, in front of a crowd of 11,608, this was Leeds' first Challenge Cup Final win in their first appearance.

Club career
Frank Young initially considered joining Oldham, but subsequently joined Leeds in 1906 for a signing-on fee of £70 (based on increases in average earnings, this would be approximately £24,870 in 2013). Frank Young was badly injured during the 34-25 victory over Metropolis at the Royal Agricultural Society Showground on Saturday 18 June 1910 during the 1910 Great Britain Lions tour of Australia and New Zealand, he played no further part in the tour, and failed to fully recover from the injury, retiring in March of the 1910–11 Northern Rugby Football Union season.

References

External links

1880s births
1941 deaths

Year of birth uncertain
Bristol Bears players
Cardiff RFC players
Footballers who switched code
Great Britain national rugby league team players
Leeds Rhinos players
London Welsh RFC players
Rugby league fullbacks
Rugby league players from Cardiff
Glamorgan County RFC players
Rugby union players from Cardiff
Wales national rugby league team players
Welsh rugby league players
Welsh rugby union players